Experimental Mine, U.S. Bureau of Mines is a landmark located in the Pittsburgh suburb of Bruceton, Pennsylvania.  In 1910, the newly created U.S. Bureau of Mines leased a 38-acre tract of land from the Pittsburgh Coal Company and opened the Experimental Mine.

One of the early findings in the Experimental Mine demonstrated that coal dust by itself was capable of propagating an explosion even in the absence of any methane gas. This demonstration was contrary to the old belief widely held at the time that coal dust could not explode without gas. This view had led to the very dangerous and widespread practice of using loose coal dust in mines to pack explosives in boreholes, which had cost many thousands of lives. These early experiments clearly proved that such a practice was too hazardous to continue.

Current facilities
By 1999 the complex made the transition to lab and office space as part of the National Energy Technology Laboratory network throughout the United States.  The complex is home to three major agencies including the Federal Energy Technology Center (U.S. Department of Energy), the National Institute for Occupational Safety and Health (U.S. Department of Health and Human Services, Centers for Disease Control), and the Mine Safety & Health Administration (U.S. Department of Labor). Over one thousand government and contractor employees worked at the site by 2000.

See also
RDX
Bruceton analysis
National Energy Technology Laboratory
National Register of Historic Places listings in Allegheny County, Pennsylvania

References

External links
C-SPAN program on the mine

Further reading
 

Government buildings on the National Register of Historic Places in Pennsylvania
Buildings and structures in Allegheny County, Pennsylvania
Underground mines in the United States
Mines in Pennsylvania
National Register of Historic Places in Allegheny County, Pennsylvania
United States Bureau of Mines